Chrysis provancheri is a species of cuckoo wasp in the family Chrysididae.

References

 "A synopsis of the Chrysididae in America North of Mexico", Bohart R.M., Kimsey L.S. 1982. Memoirs of the American Entomological Institute 33: 1–266.

Further reading

 

Chrysidinae
Hymenoptera of North America